Palestinians in Egypt refers to the Palestinian refugees who fled or were expelled to Egypt during the 1948 Palestine war, and their descendants, as well as Palestinians expelled from Jordan, following the events of Black September. Palestinians and their descendants have never been naturalized and so keep the distinct status of Palestinian refugee. Some Palestinians, mostly Christians, received Egyptian citizenship through marriage with Egyptian nationals or by other means.

There was also an earlier wave of Palestinian immigration, in which Palestinian Christians settled in Egypt and other surrounding countries, fleeing genocides during the Ottoman era, along with Lebanese and Syrians, forming what was known as the "Shawam" (شوام) Christian community.
 
Estimates of the size of the Palestinian population in Egypt range from 50,245 to 110,000.

See also 
Palestinians
Palestinian diaspora

References

Arabs in Egypt
Ethnic groups in Egypt
Egypt